Akhtachi-ye Gharbi Rural District is in the Central District of Mahabad County, West Azerbaijan province, Iran. At the National Census of 2006, its population was 7,899 in 1,452 households. There were 7,455 inhabitants in 1,519 households at the following census of 2011. At the most recent census of 2016, the population of the rural district was 7,412 in 1,842 households. The largest of its 40 villages was Seyyedabad, with 1,010 people.

References 

Mahabad County

Rural Districts of West Azerbaijan Province

Populated places in West Azerbaijan Province

Populated places in Mahabad County